Maksim Gennadyevich Nosov (born 19 November 1976) is a former Russian football player.

References

1976 births
Living people
Russian footballers
FC Lada-Tolyatti players
FC Yenisey Krasnoyarsk players
FC Lokomotiv Nizhny Novgorod players
Russian Premier League players
FC Tyumen players
FC Orenburg players
FC Zvezda Irkutsk players
FC Mordovia Saransk players
Association football defenders
PFC Krylia Sovetov Samara players
FC Dynamo Makhachkala players
FC Spartak Nizhny Novgorod players
FC Amur Blagoveshchensk players